"Letter from Houston" is a song by American rapper and singer Rod Wave, released on August 7, 2020 as part of the deluxe edition of his second studio album Pray 4 Love. The song's intro samples the 2009 song "Delirious" by American R&B duo Vistoso Bosses and rapper Soulja Boy. The song finds Rod Wave writing a "heartfelt" letter to his loved one who he is in a long-distance relationship with.

Critical reception
Billboards Carl Lamarre said the rapper "writes an endearing note to his love". Similarly, Paul Duong of Rap Radar labelled the song a "heartfelt letter" that Rod Wave pens to his missed love one. AllHipHop named the song a highlight from Pray 4 Love, and said Wave delivers a "soul-snatching croon".

Music video
The official video was released on August 6, 2020. The TruFilms-directed visual shows the effects of stardom on Rod's relationship with his lover. He is seen in the driver's seat of a Rolls-Royce and in a dark room dimmed with a light.

Charts

Certifications

References

2020 songs
Rod Wave songs
Songs written by Rod Wave